Cordova is an unincorporated community and census-designated place in Richmond County, North Carolina, United States. Its population was 1,775 as of the 2010 census. Cordova has a post office with ZIP code 28330.

Cordova is a suburban town of Rockingham.

History 
A post office, named Steeles Mill, existed in the area of Cordova as early as 1828. A Cordova post office was established in 1899.

Geography 
Cordova is located in southwest Richmond County along the Pee Dee River.

References

Works cited 
 

Census-designated places in North Carolina
Census-designated places in Richmond County, North Carolina